The Fairmont Black Diamonds were an American minor league baseball team based in Fairmont, West Virginia. They played under several names between 1907 and 1931.

They played in the Western Pennsylvania League in 1907, the Pennsylvania–West Virginia League in 1909 and 1914, the West Virginia League in 1910, the Ohio–Pennsylvania League in 1912 and the Middle Atlantic League from 1925–1931. They were known as the Fairmont Badies in 1908. In 1914, a team known only as Fairmont played once again in the Pennsylvania–West Virginia League. The team posted a 3-2 record, before the league ceased operations on June 1, 1914.

Notable players include major leaguers Reddy Mack, who managed the team in 1907 and Everett Scott.

References

External links
Baseball Reference

Defunct minor league baseball teams
Middle Atlantic League teams
Pennsylvania-West Virginia League teams
Ohio-Pennsylvania League teams
West Virginia League teams
Western Pennsylvania League teams
Baseball teams established in 1907
Sports clubs disestablished in 1931
1907 establishments in West Virginia
1931 disestablishments in West Virginia
Defunct baseball teams in West Virginia
Baseball teams disestablished in 1931